Parapuzosia is an extinct genus of desmoceratid ammonites from the Cenomanian to the Campanian of Africa, Europe, and North America. It possesses a moderately involute shell with flat or slightly rounded sides. Distinct primary and secondary ribbing can be observed in the inner whorls.

Etymology 
The origin of the generic name Parapuzosia ("similar to Puzosia") comes from the smaller, related desmatoceratid Puzosia. "Puzosia" comes from the Serbian words "пужа/Puzo" (Snail) and "Oca/Osia" (Axis), translating to "snail axis".

References 

Desmoceratidae
Ammonitida genera
Cenomanian genus first appearances
Coniacian life
Santonian life
Turonian life
Campanian genus extinctions
Ammonites of Africa
Cretaceous ammonites of Europe
Cretaceous ammonites of North America
Fossil taxa described in 1894